Meşelik is an unpopulated village in the Şemdinli District in Hakkâri Province in Turkey. The village had a population of 0 in 2021 but was previously populated by Kurds of the Herkî tribe.

The hamlet of Yaman is attached to the village.

History 
Population history of the village from 1985 to 2022:

References 

Villages in Şemdinli District
Kurdish settlements in Hakkâri Province
Unpopulated villages in Turkey